Selfless may refer to:

Selflessness, the act of sacrificing one's own interest for the greater good
Selfless service
Selfless (album), a 1994 album by English industrial metal band Godflesh
Self/less, a 2015 film starring Ryan Reynolds
"Selfless" (Buffy the Vampire Slayer), a 2002 episode of Buffy the Vampire Slayer
"Selfless" (Prison Break), a 2008 Prison Break episode
Selfless Gaming, esports team
 Selfless, a song from the 2020 album The New Abnormal.